Yvonne Curtis (born Yvonne McIntosh) is a singer of Jamaican descent. She has lived in the United Kingdom since the early 1960s. She became the lead singer of The Serenaders and often travels back and forth from the Caribbean Islands performing as a reggae and soca artist.

History
Born and raised in Jamaica, the young gospel singer Curtis left St. Ann's, Jamaica in the 1960s as a teenager for a better life and education in England. She continued her musical career from her new home in Highbury and Islington, London. Whilst studying in college in the 1970s, Curtis sang in many local bands before she decided it was time to seriously pursue her singing career.

1970s

A local recording producer needed a backing vocalist for his musical project and a contest was held in Stockwell, South London. Having been advised to enter, the young Curtis came second in the contest to her best friend who came first from which producer took them both on asking them to conduct vocals session works.

During the mid-1970s, Curtis joined a local band called the Okendoes and Chalis thereafter to which she found no real success. After many different small projects in 1975 and no real commercial success she began working with a record label called Third World Music under Shelly Barrett aka Count Shelly who released Curtis's first song entitled "What's Your Name" which was an instant success. Things began moving and she soon left Third World Records to sign with London's Empire Records, which was a subsidiary division of Jamaica's Channel One Studios with whom she released another hit song called 'Convenient Woman', written by Curtis. After two years she left Empire Records to release her own single called 'No Charge' which was on World Sounds Records before joining a successful reggae band called the Serenaders who were signed to Brown's Music Records. The first release by this band was a single entitled 'Only for Lovers' and soon after came 'Sweet Loving' which was a successful hit song written by Curtis. The song did extremely well and caused a huge demand for her tours and performances globally. During 1994 she travelled to (Germany), Nicaragua and Brazil creating a fan base and was performing for the Warehouse Showcase show which was televised for the UK's, London's Carlton Television to which she also appeared. In 1998 she appeared with Pete Campbell on The Big Breakfast on Channel 4 and featured in songs by the Reggae Boys. During this time, she was constantly writing and recording songs under Brown's Music & World Sounds Records both as a solo artist and under the band named 'Wavet' which included further performances at the Royal Albert Hall in London.

The mid-2000s
In the year 2000, the Serenaders fell apart upon the death of three of its members and Curtis went back to World Sound Records to continue recording her new songs. In 2013, on a joint venture with Browns Records, she released an album entitled 'Lets Unite in Love' which was distributed VP Records in the US. The album was an instant success and caused a notable demand for Curtis' music worldwide. In 2015, Curtis met record producer and label owner Mark Duffus and joined Digital Jukebox Records in 2015. The first release was a three CD compilation of her greatest hits, followed by a crossover version of the Christmas medley ‘When a Child is Born’ & ‘Mary's Boy Child’. John Nolan, a journalist and reviewer for 'Reggae in New York' spoke very highly of the album's success in the United States, stating, "Often the most talented artists go for decades without the commercial recognition they deserve. Despite her lack of commercial success Curtis is a driving force in reggae music with an evolving sound that has spanned the entire reggae spectrum. Since 1978 she has released 11 albums, as well as numerous compilations and singles.".

Today
Curtis goes back and forth from Jamaica, the Caribbean to London and has found her home with Digital Jukebox Records and is continuing to release and write new songs with her producers. During a radio interview in Gloucester by presenter Perry Jay for the Reggae Time Show, Jay described the show as absolutely fantastic stating how the crowds would continuously sing her songs back to her in appreciation."In a recent interview by Yasmine Peru writer for The Gleaner, she spoke of the success of Yvonne's global hit song 'Sweet Senation', its success and how she was initially introduced to the UK's music executive Mark Anthony (Blak Prophetz) owner of Digital Jukebox Records in 2015. Yvonne was a regular act on the weekly Carlton Television Show - called 'The Warehouse' which was presented by British comedian Miles Crawford in the mid 80's where she was and still is considered one of the hardest-working Jamaican female reggae vocalist in the business. Through her challenges on the road to recognition and her soon-to-be-released documentary, Untold Reggae, which traces her life from her roots in Steer Town, St Ann, to the present, Yvonne is very excited about her future and return to perform in South America.

During the following month she was interviewed by Jerade James for Future Topic Magazine & Black British Musicians reminising her performance at the London's Royal Albert Hall for the Barbados Independence during the mid 90's function along with other reputable Soca music artists like the Mighty Gabby & Grynner.

Discography
Albums
1986 In the Country, Brown Records
1992 Yvonne Cutis & Wavet – Socca, Brown Records
1995 Best of Yvonne Curtis, Brown Records
1997 Yvonne Says Hello, World Sound
2000 Move On, Brown Records
2000 Yvonne Curtis 2000, World Sound
2002 Just as I Am-Gospel, World Sound
2004 Eternal Love, World Sound
2004 Walls of Tears, World Sound
2006 Table for Two, World Sound
2013 Let's Unite in Love, Brown Records
2014 Greatest Hits, Digital Jukebox Records

Singles
1978 "What's Your Name", Third World
1979 "Convenient Woman" b/w "Rather Go Blind", Empire Records
(N/A) "No Charge", BB Records
(N/A) "Only for Lovers", Brown Music
1983 "Road March-Socca", Brown Music
1985 "Sweet Loving", Brown Music
1986 "Bob Marley Medley", Brown Music
1987 "Harder They Come, Brown Music
1990 "Welcome Home", Brown Music
1993 "This Is a Letter", Brown Music
1999 "Don't Let Me Down", Jet Star
(N/A) "Troubled in Mind", Brown Music
2015 Christmas Carols'', Digital Jukebox Records
2017 "Far Away (From Your Heart)", Digital Jukebox Records
2018 "Dedicated to You", Digital Jukebox Records
2019 "Son of a Preacher Man", Digital Jukebox Records
2020 "Sweet Sensation" (remastered), Digital Jukebox Records

References

External links

 Discogs
Reggae in New York, Interview
Juninho Roots bahia
Reggae Spotlights
45kat
Empire Records
Count Shelly
Digital Jukebox Records

Living people
Jamaican reggae singers
21st-century Jamaican women singers
20th-century Jamaican women singers
Jamaican emigrants to the United Kingdom
20th-century Black British women singers
Year of birth missing (living people)
21st-century Black British women singers